The 2011 Jacksonville Dolphins football team represented Jacksonville University in the 2011 NCAA Division I FCS football season. The Dolphins were led by fifth-year head coach Kerwin Bell and played their home games at D. B. Milne Field. They are a member of the Pioneer Football League. They finished the season 7–4, 6–2 in PFL play to finish in third place.

Schedule

References

Jacksonville
Jacksonville Dolphins football seasons
Jacksonville Dolphins football